Prinerigone is a genus of sheet weavers that was first described by Alfred Frank Millidge in 1988.

Species
 it contains three species and one subspecies:
P. aethiopica (Tullgren, 1910) – Cameroon, Kenya, Tanzania
P. pigra (Blackwall, 1862) – Madeira
P. vagans (Audouin, 1826) (type) – Europe, North Africa, Middle East to Iran, Central Asia and China. Introduced to Marion Is.
P. v. arabica (Jocqué, 1981) – Saudi Arabia

See also
 List of Linyphiidae species (I–P)

References

Araneomorphae genera
Linyphiidae
Spiders of Africa
Spiders of Asia